Toulmouche may refer to:

Auguste Toulmouche (1829–1890), French painter 
Frédéric Toulmouche (1850–1919), French composer